"Ode" is a poem written by the English poet Arthur O'Shaughnessy and first published in 1873. It is the first poem in O'Shaughnessy's collection Music and Moonlight (1874). "Ode" has nine stanzas, although it is commonly believed to be only three stanzas long. The opening stanza is:

The phrase "movers and shakers" (now used to describe powerful and worldly individuals and groups) originates here.

The first two lines of the poem were recited by Gene Wilder as Willy Wonka in Willy Wonka & the Chocolate Factory (1971), which was later sampled by Aphex Twin on the track "We are the Music Makers" from his debut album Selected Ambient Works 85-92. The poem has also been set to music, or alluded to, many times. Sir Edward Elgar set the ode to music in 1912 in his work The Music Makers, Op. 69, dedicated to Elgar's old friend Nicholas Kilburn, and the first performance took place in 1912 at the Birmingham Triennial Music Festival. Performances available include: The Music Makers, with Sir Adrian Boult conducting the London Philharmonic Orchestra in 1975 (reissued 1999), paired with Elgar's The Dream of Gerontius; and the 2006 album Sea Pictures, paired with The Music Makers, Simon Wright conducting the Bournemouth Symphony Orchestra. Zoltán Kodály (1882–1967) set "Ode" to music in his work Music Makers, dedicated to Merton College, Oxford, on the occasion of its 700th anniversary in 1964.

References

External links
Full Text of Poem

English poems